Community High School District 99 is a local school district serving Downers Grove, Woodridge, Westmont, Darien, Lisle, Bolingbrook, and Oak Brook in the state of Illinois. A non-residential portion of Lombard also is zoned to this district. It consists of two high schools, North High School and South High School, both located in Downers Grove. The current Superintendent of this district is Henry Thiele, a position formerly held by Dr. Mark McDonald.

History
In 2015 Henry Thiele (pronounced THEE-lee) was named district superintendent, effective July 1, 2016. He previously worked for Maine Township High School District 207 as the assistant superintendent for technology and learning.

Student Demographics

Race

Other
Definitions can be found on the District Report Card.

Staff
The teaching staff is 324 teachers, who have taught for an average of 13.5 years. Over 83.2% of teachers hold a master's degree or higher. The average salary for the equivalent of a full-time teacher is $89,652, over $25,000 above than the state average, and $118,419 for an administrator, over $18,000 above the state average. The Student-to-teacher ratio is 19 to 1, and the student to administrator ratio is 108 to 1.

Finances
For 2015, Fiscal Year 2013-2014

Sources

Expenses

School Board
The Board of education for District 99 consists of 7 members. Each member serves for four years, and every other year (during even-numbered years) an election is held. Elections of Board members are scheduled such that four positions come up for election on years divisible by four, and three members come up for election on even numbered years not divisible by four.

Current School Board
Nancy Kupka (President)
Next election for position: 2023
Michael Davenport  (Vice President)
Next election for position: 2023
Terry Pavesich
Next election for position: 2025
Sherell Fuller
Next election for position: 2025
Jennifer Hagstrom
Next election for position: 2025
Christopher Espinoza  
Next election for position: 2025
Joanna Vazquez Drexler
Next election for position: 2023

References

External links
 

School districts in DuPage County, Illinois
Bolingbrook, Illinois
Downers Grove, Illinois
School districts established in 1923
1923 establishments in Illinois